Lac Iro may refer to:
                 
 Lac Iro Department, a department in Moyen-Chari, Chad
 Lac Iro (lake), a lake in Chad